Vittore Soranzo (Venice, 26 July 1500 – Venice, 13 May 1558) was an Italian bishop who served as Bishop of Bergamo (1547–1552).

Bibliography 

Massimo Firpo and Sergio Pagano, I processi inquisitoriali di Vittore Soranzo (1550-1558), Città del Vaticano, Archivio segreto vaticano, 2004 
Massimo Firpo, Vittore Soranzo, vescovo ed eretico. Riforma della Chiesa e Inquisizione nell'Italia del Cinquecento, Roma-Bari, Laterza, 2006

References

External links and additional sources
 (for Chronology of Bishops) 
 (for Chronology of Bishops) 

16th-century Roman Catholic bishops in the Republic of Venice
1500 births
1558 deaths
Bishops of Bergamo